Teodoro García Simental (a.k.a.: El Teo and El Tres Letras, born 1974) is a former lieutenant of the Mexican criminal organization known as the Tijuana Cartel, and later allied with the Sinaloa Cartel. He was arrested by Mexican Federal Police - Special Forces on 12 January 2010 in La Paz, Baja California Sur.

Biography 
He started working for Tijuana Cartel in 1995, along with his brother, Antonio García Simental, (alias "8-9" or "El Chris"), who was a cartel enforcer, under the orders of Ramón Arellano Félix. When the Tijuana Cartel leader Eduardo Arellano Félix was arrested on October 25, 2008, a violent power struggle erupted between Teodoro García and Luis Fernando Sánchez Arellano over the leadership of the Tijuana cartel. Teodoro García left the organization, formed his own gang, and forged an uneasy alliance with the rival Sinaloa Cartel. When splitting from the Tijuana Cartel, his faction engaged in a war with it, which caused violent crime in Tijuana to increase significantly. According to Tijuana's Chief of Police, García was principally responsible in the late 2000s for the increase in the number of homicides in the city.

Teodoro García is best known for running an extortion and kidnapping network, and is also known for dissolving the bodies of those who are in business with rival drug gangs by drowning them in caustic soda. Upon being arrested, García's lieutenant, Santiago Meza López — known as the Stew Maker, claimed to have dissolved over three hundred bodies this way in 2008. The Mexican Army stated that it believed Meza's claims to be true.

Arrest 
The Mexican Federal Police was offering a $2 million USD bounty for information leading to the capture of Teodoro García Simental. He was also wanted by the U.S. Drug Enforcement Administration (DEA).

Teodoro García Simental was arrested on January 12, 2010, by Mexican Federal Police in a luxury home complex named Fidepaz, located in La Paz, Baja California Sur. He was arrested together with an individual by the name of Diego Raymundo Guerrero García. One month later, on February 7, 2010, Manuel García Simental, Teodoro's younger brother and lieutenant, was arrested in the Baja California port city of La Paz. Authorities feared Manuel was planning to reignite a gang war for control of Tijuana's drug trafficking routes.

See also 
Mérida Initiative
Mexican Drug War
List of Mexico's 37 most-wanted drug lords
War on Drugs

References

External links

Photo gallery related to Teodoro El Teo García

1974 births
Fugitives
Living people
Mexican drug traffickers
People from Culiacán
Sinaloa Cartel traffickers
Tijuana Cartel traffickers